Gianni Bruno (born 19 August 1991) is a Belgian professional footballer who plays as a forward for Sint-Truiden on loan from Gent.

Club career

Early career
Bruno was born in Rocourt, a local town in the city of Liège, to Italian parents. As a result, he possesses dual-nationality. He began his career playing for hometown club FC Liège where his father was a coach. After seven years at the club, after Liège endured financial difficulties, Bruno moved to one of the biggest clubs in the country Standard Liège. He spent seven years at Standard and was a two-time national champion at under-12 and under-17 level with the club. Towards the end of his tenure at Standard, Bruno featured with the club's reserve team in a match against Anderlecht. Despite receiving a professional contract offer from Standard, Bruno departed the club to join Lille in France. He justified departing the club citing France's better training methods and Lille's close proximity to his home in Belgium.

Lille
Bruno began his career at Lille in the club's youth academy in Luchin. After two years in the club's academy, during the 2008–09 season, he began playing on the club's reserve team in the Championnat de France amateur, the fourth level of French football. Bruno was promoted to the reserve team full-time in the following season. He appeared in 27 matches scoring a team-high 11 goals. After playing the 2010–11 season with the reserve team, on 8 June 2011, Bruno signed his first professional contract agreeing to a one-year deal with Lille. He was, subsequently, promoted to the senior team by manager Rudi Garcia and assigned the number 19 shirt.

Bruno made his professional debut on 11 January 2012 appearing as a substitute in a 2–1 defeat to Lyon in the Coupe de la Ligue. Fours days later, he made his league debut appearing as a substitute in another defeat, this time to Marseille.

Bruno was sent on loan to Bastia for the 2013–14 season.

Evian
At the beginning of the 2014–15 season, Bruno joined Evian Thonon Gaillard on a five-year contract. A few months later, he was loaned to fellow Ligue 1 team FC Lorient.

Cercle Brugge
On 3 July 2017, Cercle Brugge announced the transfer of Gianni to the organization. He signed a contract for one season.

Gent
On 11 June 2021, after scoring 20 goals in the previous season for Zulte Waregem, Bruno joined Gent on a three-year contract.

On 13 July 2022, Bruno moved on a season-long loan to Sint-Truiden.

International career
Bruno is a Belgian youth international and has played for all levels for which he has been eligible. In total with the Belgian youth international teams, he has attained 59 caps and scored 33 goals.

Career statistics

Club

References

External links
 Club profile 
 
 
 
 
 

1991 births
Living people
Footballers from Liège
Association football forwards
Belgian footballers
Belgian people of Italian descent
Italian footballers
Belgian expatriate footballers
Belgium under-21 international footballers
Ligue 1 players
Lille OSC players
Belgian Pro League players
Challenger Pro League players
SC Bastia players
Thonon Evian Grand Genève F.C. players
PFC Krylia Sovetov Samara players
Russian Premier League players
Cercle Brugge K.S.V. players
S.V. Zulte Waregem players
K.A.A. Gent players
Sint-Truidense V.V. players
Expatriate footballers in France
Expatriate footballers in Russia
Belgian expatriate sportspeople in France
Belgian expatriate sportspeople in Russia